Nawab Salahuddin Ahmed Abbasi is a Member of Parliament in Pakistan. He is also the grandson of Sadeq Mohammad Khan V, who was the last ruling Nawab of the Princely State Bahawalpur. He has been elected five times as Member of National Assembly from the city Ahmadpur East. He is also the Chief of Bahawalpur National Awami Party (BNAP) which is allied with Imran Khan's Pakistan Tehreek-i-Insaf. Nawab Salahuddin Abbasi is also a strong campaigner of restoration of Bahawalpur province and an influential personality of South Punjab.

Public life
He was appointed as the heir apparent, on the death of his grandfather, 24 May 1966. Succeeded on the death of his father on 14 April 1988 as head of the Royal House of Bahawalpur and was recognized as "Ameer of Bahawalpur" by the Government of Pakistan. He is officially styled as H.H. Jalalat ul-Mulk, Rukn ud-Daula, Saif ud-Daula, Hafiz ul-Mulk, Mukhlis ud-Daula wa Muin ud-Daula, Nawab Salah ud-din Ahmad Khan Abbasi Bahadur, Nusrat Jung, Amir of the God gifted kingdom of Bahawalpur. He is also the Patron of National Red Crescent Soc 1975. Patron-in-Chief Pakistan Social Assoc, Anjuman Ashait-e-Seerat-un-Nabi (Bahawalpur), and Pakistan Minorities Social Welfare Organization. President Markazai Seerat Cttee 1976, and Bahawalpur Divisional Rover Scouts. Chair Sir Sadiq Mohd Khan Trust. Founder Dir Foundation for Advancement of Engineering Sciences & Advanced Technologies since 2001. Mbr National Seerat Cttee 1976, Chancellor's Cttee of Islamia Univ of Bahawalpur, Governing Body of Sadiq Public Sch, Punjab Welfare Brd, Punjab Council on Social Welfare, etc.

Privilege 
Nawab maintains the royal title of Nawab, a diplomatic car number plate and a diplomatic passport in Pakistan. He also enjoys a very respected status in the Bahawalpur region.

Politics 
Nawab has remained member of the National Assembly repeatedly from the city Ahmadpur East as an independent candidate, In 2008 elections all of the Nawab backed candidates won from Bahawalpur, Bahawalnagar and Rahim Yar Khan thus Nawab is said to have significant influence in the region. In 2012 Nawab formed his own political party Bahawalpur National Awami Party (BNAP) which in 2013 allied with Imran Khan led Pakistan Tehreek-e-Insaf (PTI) for 2013 elections. Now (BNAP) is not allied with PTI.

See also 
Nawab Sadiq Muhammad Khan Abbasi V
Imran Khan
Pakistan Tehreek-i-Insaf

References

Living people
People from Bahawalpur District
Bahawalpur royal family
Pakistan Tehreek-e-Insaf politicians
Pakistani MNAs 2002–2007
Pakistani MNAs 2008–2013
Year of birth missing (living people)